Peter Steven (born 4 July 1959 in Kilwinning) is a former Scotland international rugby union player.

Rugby Union career

Amateur career

Steven played for Heriot's.

Provincial career

He represented Edinburgh District.

He played for Combined Scottish Districts on 1 March 1986 against South of Scotland.

International career

Steven received a Scotland 'B' on 19 March 1983.

He went on to be capped by the senior Scotland side 4 times.

References

1959 births
Living people
Scottish rugby union players
Scotland international rugby union players
Edinburgh District (rugby union) players
Scotland 'B' international rugby union players
Heriot's RC players
Scottish Districts (combined) players